The 2016 CBSA Haining International Snooker Open was a non-ranking snooker tournament that took place from 17 to 21 October 2016 in Haining, China.

Matthew Selt defeated Li Hang 5–3 in the final.

Prize fund
The breakdown of prize money of the event is shown below:

Main draw

Top half

Section 1

Section 2

Section 3

Section 4

Bottom half

Section 5

Section 6

Section 7

Section 8

Finals

References

Haining Open
Haining Open
Haining Open
Haining Open